Margit Elek (5 May 1910 – 4 February 1986) was a Hungarian Olympic foil fencer.

She was born in Budapest, Hungary, was the sister of Olympic champion Ilona Elek, and was Jewish. She competed in the women's individual foil events at the 1948 and 1952 Summer Olympics. She also won the silver medal at the 1934 World Fencing Championships.

References

External links
 

1910 births
1986 deaths
Hungarian female foil fencers
Jewish female foil fencers
Jewish Hungarian sportspeople
Jewish sportswomen
Olympic fencers of Hungary
Fencers at the 1948 Summer Olympics
Fencers at the 1952 Summer Olympics
Fencers from Budapest